The Instituto Universitario de Restauración del Patrimonio (the IRP) of the Polytechnic University of Valencia is a public Spanish institution dedicated to promoting heritage conservation research and practice.

History 

The IRP was created in 2000 as ENCI (Estructura No Convencional de Investigación – Unconventional Research Structure) according to the UPV government committee of 21 December 1999.

Later, according to the Spanish Order 6/2006, of 13 January, of the local government (Generalitat Valenciana) (DOGV-núm. 5179 of 18 January 2006), the IRP was appointed as Research University Institute of the Universitat Politècnica de València.

Services 
The Instituto Universitario de Restauración del Patrimonio is divided into two areas: the area of intervention in the Pictorial and Sculptural Heritage and the area of intervention in the Architectural Heritage, and a Training and Dissemination area.

The area of intervention in the pictorial and sculptural heritage operates in both basic research and applied research in seeking to acquire new knowledge to develop new products, techniques, processes, methods and systems that improve existing ones. The area of intervention in the Pictorial and Sculptural Heritage consist in restoration workshops:
 Mural Painting: cool, dry, glue, tempera, sgraffito
 Easel Painting and Altars: canvas, board, altarpiece
 Sculptural and Ornamental Materials: stone, mortar, stucco, bronze, terracotta, wood
 Golden, polychrome, furniture and expertizing
 Archaeological and ethnographic materials: flooring, tiles, ceramic tiles, glass, archaeological remains, tapestry, vestment, robes
 Graphic and Documentary: drawing, scroll, prints, book, photograph, manuscript

The intervention Area of Architectural Heritage comprises: 
 Monumental and Historic Architecture
 Landscape and rural heritage
 Research, Restoration of Architectural Heritage and Outreach
 Urban Analysis
 Engineering applied to Heritage
 Color Research on Heritage
 Documentation, Critical Analysis and Promotion of Heritage
 Museum

References 

DECRETO 6/2006, de 13 de enero, del Consell de la Generalitat

External links 
IRP
Universitat Politècnica de València
Ciudad Politécnica de la Innovación

Universities in the Valencian Community
Conservation and restoration organizations
1999 establishments in Spain